Never Again may refer to:
Never again, a phrase associated with the Holocaust and other genocides

Film and television
 Never Again (1916 film), a silent comedy short starring Oliver Hardy
 Never Again (1924 film), featuring Al St. John
 Never Again (2001 film), a film by Eric Schaeffer
 "Never Again" (The X-Files), a 1997 episode of The X-Files
 "Never Again", an episode of Alfred Hitchcock Presents
 "Never Again… Never Again", an episode of Magnum, P.I.

Literature
 Never Again (series), a series of alternate history books by R. J. Rummel
 Never Again: Securing America and Restoring Justice, a book by John Ashcroft
Never Again: Ustashi Genocide in the Independent State of Croatia (NDH) from 1941-1945, a book by Milan Bulajić
 "Never Again": A History of the Holocaust, a 2000 book by Martin Gilbert
Never Again: Britain 1945–51, a 1992 book by Peter Hennessy
 Never Again! A Program for Survival, a 1972 book by Meir Kahane

Music

Albums
 Never Again! (James Moody album) (1972)
 Never Again (Lee Soo Young album) (2001)
 Never Again (Discharge album) (1984)
 Never Again (Discharge EP), or the title song

Songs
"Never Again" (Agnetha song) (1982)
"Never Again" (Breaking Benjamin) (2017)
"Never Again" (Kelly Clarkson song) (2007)
"Never Again" (Danny Fernandes song) (2009)
"Never Again" (The Midway State song) (2008)
"Never Again" (Nickelback song) (2002)
"Never... Again", a song by All Shall Perish from Awaken the Dreamers
"Never Again", a song by Angelic Upstarts from Teenage Warning
"Never Again", a 2008 song by Asia from Phoenix
"Never Again", a song by Cellador from Enter Deception
"Never Again", a song by Disturbed from Asylum
"Never Again", a song by Killswitch Engage from Killswitch Engage (2009 album)
"Never Again", a song by Milk Inc.
"Never Again", a song by Paradise Lost from Believe in Nothing
"Never Again", a song by Power Quest from Master of Illusion
"Never Again", a song by Remedy from The Genuine Article
"Never Again", a song by Justin Timberlake from Justified

See also
 Lest We Forget (disambiguation)
 Never Again Action a Jewish political action organization
 "Never Again, Again", a 1997 song performed by Lee Ann Womack 
 "Never Again" Association, an anti-racist organization in Poland
 "Never Again" Declaration, a 2016 declaration adopted at a conference organized by Raoul Wallenberg Centre for Human Rights
 Never Again MSD, a student-led gun control advocacy group
 Never Again pledge, a United States campaign against a database identifying persons by race or religion
 Never Forget (disambiguation)
 Never Say Never Again, a 1983 James Bond film
 Nie wieder (disambiguation)
 Nunca Más (disambiguation)